Anastassiya is a female given name. Notable people with this given name include the following:

Anastassiya Bannova (born 1989), Kazakhstani archer
Anastassiya Batuyeva (born 1987), Kazakhstani handball player
Anastassiya Krestova (born 1996), Kazakhstani short track speed skater
Anastassiya Prilepa, (born 1990), Kazakhstani swimmer
Anastassiya Rodina (born 1991), Kazakhstani handball player
Anastassiya Rostovchshikova (born 1994), Kazakhstani volleyball player
Anastassiya Slonova (born 1991), Kazakhstani cross-country skier
Anastassiya Soprunova (born 1986), Kazakhstani hurdler
Anastassiya Vinogradova (born 1986), Kazakhstani hurdler

See also

Anastassya Kudinova
Anastasiya
Anastassia

Feminine given names